The Bureau for Economic Policy Analysis (CPB, literal translation: Central Planning Bureau) is a part of the Ministry of Economic Affairs and Climate Policy of the Netherlands. Its goal is to deliver economic analysis and forecasts. The CPB is an independent government agency founded at 15 September 1945 by Nobel laureate Jan Tinbergen. On 21 April 1947, it obtained its legal basis. It is located in The Hague, on Bezuidenhoutseweg.

Clients of the CPB are mainly the cabinet of the Netherlands, politicians and political parties, ministries of the Netherlands, labour unions and employers' organisations. It also provides reports and advice for European Union initiatives. One of the government appointed members in the Social and Economic Council is Chair of the CPB.

Status
The CPB is financed by the Ministry of Economic Affairs, but it operates independently. This means it does have a stable income but also does not have to follow the ministry. This combination is the foundation for the unique status of the CPB. The CPB is asked to analyze the election platforms of the major parties for the effects of proposed policies on the budget deficit, unemployment, inflation, income differentials, and so forth. This makes a clear guide for voters because of the following advantages:
 The same underlying economics base scenario for the next government's term is used to evaluate each election program. This means that differences in the outcomes between the parties cannot be due to diverging assumptions about economic developments.
The political parties have to elaborate and explain their proposals in such a way that the CPB is able to analyze them. This means that the parties cannot (on the basis of unfounded optimism) exaggerate the benefits and/or understate the costs of their proposals.
The policy proposals and their financial consequences are presented in a comparable way. This means that the parties' commitments in the financial and economic sphere can be compared to each other
The CPB systematically investigates the consistency of the programs. In their initial proposals there maybe some "miscalculations", but such issues are invariably resolved in the detailed discussions between the party in question and the CPB.
The CPB only includes in its analysis measures which are expected to be technically and legally feasible. If the CPB does not have the in-house expertise to judge the feasibility or the legality of certain proposals, it obtains advice from other institutions.

It is also not uncommon to use the results of the CPB to defend attack or compare the different policies.

Parties voluntarily subject their programs to CPB analysis. However, after the elections of 1986, it became a custom that each major party asked the CPB to forecast the consequences of their election program. In general, the parties seem to worry more about being accused of not wanting to face the economic consequences of their proposals than showing negative results. In 2002, the party "List Pim Fortuyn" did not submit their elections platform, although it came in as second largest party.

The CPB analyzes government budget proposals on its own initiative. The analysis is considered a key document when determining how successful a government is with it policies. The results of this analysis is the basis for the income and expenditure for the Ministry of Economic Affairs. Through the independent status of the CPS, it is in practice impossible for the Dutch government to use their own models and interpretations of statistics. This forces the government, regardless of who is in power, to stay within the given boundaries and lowers the chance of budget surprises. It also increases the credibility of the ministry estimates.

Operations
Twice a year, the CPB publishes a macroeconomic forecast called the "Central Economic Plan (CEP)" and the "Macroeconomic Explorations (MEV)".

The CEP is published in March. It includes the forecast for all the major variables and the current policies. At this point in time, new policies are decided or changed and they have a chance to look at the coming economic situation. For this purpose, it updates the forecasts of the previous MEV about the effects of the policies. A provisional version of the CEP is supplied to the cabinet in January or February, which is used by the minister of finance for the expenditure targets.

The MEV is published in September simultaneously with the publication of government budgets for the following year. It includes forecast for all the major variables and the effects of the new policies since last year. A preliminary, confidential, draft is sent to the government in June. Some adjustments of expenditures and revenues between the draft and the final version can be made.

Models 
The CPB uses several models to analyze policies and the economy. Their main model is SAFFIER II, next to this there are several small models which can be attached to SAFFIER II.

In May 2010 the CPB changed from SAFFIER to SAFFIER II. It is an actualized and modernized version of SAFFIER and therefore the name is maintained. The special features of SAFFIER II are that it consists of one model, which has two time frames (quarterly and yearly) which is applied on three states (short term, medium term and long term). The major differences with SAFFIER are:
All behavioral equations have been re-estimated
Some changes on the production function, wage rate, private consumption and export have been made

SAFFIER II is built around a core of 25 equations, the behavioral equations. Then there are 270 heuristics, which are non estimated, easy equations. The major part of them are 1455 identities. These are technical equations and definition equations, which do not change over time. The model thus uses a total of 1750 equations. Next to these equations, in the model itself, there are 1250 additional equations, which do not influence outcomes of the model but help analyzing and checking the results.

The models are constructed with high detail and a lot of attention. However, models do not always reflect reality and are based on theories. In the case of CPB models, there is generally a deviation of up to 1 percentage point. The models are regularly updated to reflect new theoretical insights and needs for outcomes.

International coordination 
The CPB is a member of the EU Independent Fiscal Institutions Network set up by the EU in September 2015. In addition to the CPB, the Netherlands is also represented by the Council of State.

Controversy
In 2011, the CPB conducted a study on the effects of the Euro for the Netherlands. The results were, among others, published in the book 'Europa in crisis' (Europe in crisis). One of the conclusions of the research was that the Euro had brought about a week's pay in benefits to the Dutch population (i.e. about 2% income). In an interview in De Telegraaf in May 2014, former director Coen Teulings stated that the study performed under his supervision should be taken with a grain of salt, adding that the economic advantages "aren't very clear".

Staff 

The directors of the bureau have been:
 Jan Tinbergen (1945–1955)
 Fred Polak (1955–1957)
 Pieter de Wolff (1957–1966)
 Cees van den Beld (1966–1984)
 Peter de Ridder (1984–1989)
 Gerrit Zalm (1989–1994)
 Henk Don (1994–2006)
 Coen Teulings (2006–2013)
 Laura van Geest (2013–2020)
 Pieter Hasekamp (2020–present)

Beside the directors, other notable researchers of the institute have been:
Lans Bovenberg
Mars Cramer
Wim Driehuis
Per Schreiner
Jan Sandee
Henri Theil
Johan Witteveen

Applied policy research institutes
The CPB is one of the three applied policy research institutes of the Government of the Netherlands, the other two being:
Netherlands Environmental Assessment Agency (PBL)
The Netherlands Institute for Social Research (SCP)

References

Further reading 
Passenier, J. (1994), Van planning tot scanning, een halve eeuw Planbureau in Nederland, Wolters-Noordhoff, Groningen. (in Dutch)
SAFFIER II: 1 model voor de Nederlandse economie, in 2 hoedanigheden, voor 3 toepassingen (in Dutch)Download
Don, F., & Verbruggen, J. P. (2006), Models and methods for economic policy: 60 years of evolution at CPB. Statistica Neerlandica, 60: 145–170. doi: 10.1111/j.1467-9574.2006.00323.x

External links
 

1945 establishments in the Netherlands
Economic research institutes
Independent government agencies of the Netherlands
Research institutes in the Netherlands
Eurozone
Policy and political reactions to the Eurozone crisis
Fiscal federalism